Juan Orozco Covarrubias y Leiva (1544 – 23 June 1610) was a Roman Catholic prelate who served as Bishop of Guadix (1606–1610) and Bishop of Agrigento (1594–1606).

Biography
Juan Orozco Covarrubias y Leiva was born in Toledo, Spain in 1544 and ordained a priest on 12 May 1573.
On 2 December 1594, he was appointed during the papacy of Pope Clement VIII as Bishop of Agrigento. 
On 8 December 1594, he was consecrated bishop by Leonard Abel, Titular Bishop of Sidon, with Cristóbal Senmanat y Robuster, Bishop Emeritus of Orihuela, and Georgius Perpignani, Bishop of Tinos, serving as co-consecrators. 
On 16 January 1606, he was appointed during the papacy of Pope Paul V as Bishop of Guadix. 
He served as Bishop of Guadix until his death on 23 June 1610.

References

External links and additional sources
 (for Chronology of Bishops) 
 (for Chronology of Bishops) 
 (for Chronology of Bishops)
 (for Chronology of Bishops) 

16th-century Roman Catholic bishops in Sicily
17th-century Roman Catholic bishops in Spain
Bishops appointed by Pope Clement VIII
Bishops appointed by Pope Paul V
1544 births
1610 deaths
17th-century Roman Catholic bishops in Sicily